Rana El Husseiny (born 14 September 1991) is an Egyptian foil fencer. She competed in the women's team foil competition at the 2012 Summer Olympics, losing both her matches.

References

1991 births
Living people
Egyptian female foil fencers
Olympic fencers of Egypt
Fencers at the 2012 Summer Olympics
20th-century Egyptian women
21st-century Egyptian women